Zolmitriptan, sold under the brand name Zomig among others, is a triptan used in the acute treatment of migraine attacks with or without aura and cluster headaches. It is a selective serotonin receptor agonist of the 1B and 1D subtypes.

It was patented in 1990 and approved for medical use in 1997.

Medical uses 
Zolmitriptan is used for the acute treatment of migraines with or without aura in adults. Zolmitriptan is not intended for the prophylactic therapy of migraine or for use in the management of hemiplegic or basilar migraine.

Zolmitriptan is available as a swallowable tablet, an oral disintegrating tablet, and a nasal spray, in doses of 2.5 and 5 mg.  People who get migraines from aspartame should not use the disintegrating tablet (Zomig ZMT), which contains aspartame.

A 2014 Cochrane review has shown that zolmitriptan 5 mg nasal spray was significantly more effective than the 5 mg oral tablet.

According to a study of healthy volunteers, food intake seems to have no significant effect on the effectiveness of Zolmitriptan in both men and women.

Off-label Uses:
 Acute treatment of cluster headaches—Level A recommendation from the American Academy of Neurology
 Acute treatment of menstrual migraine

Adverse reactions 

As for cardiovascular side effects, zolmitriptan can increase systolic blood pressure in the elderly and increase diastolic blood pressure in both the elderly and young people. Additionally, there is the side effect of a dose-related increase in sedation. There is a risk of headaches caused by medication withdrawal or medication overuse.

Zolmitriptan has a weak affinity for 5-HT 1A receptors; these receptors have implications in the development of serotonin syndrome.

Following administration of cimetidine, the half-life and AUC of zolmitriptan and its active metabolites were approximately doubled (see CLINICAL PHARMACOLOGY in product pamphlet).

Contraindications

Zolmitriptan is contraindicated in patients with cerebrovascular or cardiovascular disease because 5-HT 1B receptors are present in coronary arteries. Such conditions include, but are not limited to, coronary artery disease, stroke, and peripheral vascular disease.

It is also contraindicated in hemiplegic migraine.

Mechanism of action 
Zolmitriptan is a selective 5-hydroxytryptamine 1B/1D receptor agonist with a weak affinity for the 5-HT 1A receptor subtypes. Its action on 5-HT 1B/1D receptors causes vasoconstriction in intracranial blood vessels; as well it can inhibit the release of pro-inflammatory neuropeptides from trigeminal perivascular nerve endings. It crosses the blood-brain-barrier as evidenced by the presence of radioactive [3H]-zolmitriptan labels within the cells of the trigeminal nucleus caudalis and nucleus tractus solitaries.

Pharmacokinetics

Zolmitriptan has a rapid onset of action and has been detected in the brain as early as within 5 minutes of intranasal administration. On average, zolmitriptan has an oral bioavailability of 40%, a mean volume of distribution of 8.3 L/kg after oral administration, and 2.4L/kg after intravenous administration.

Zolmitriptan is metabolized into three major metabolites by the human hepatic cytochrome P450 enzymes—primarily CYP1A2. Two-thirds of the parent compound breaks down into the active metabolite N-desmethyl-zolmitriptan (183C91), while the remaining one-third separates into the other two inactive metabolites: zolmitriptan N-oxide and an indole acetic acid derivative. It has an elimination half-life of about three hours before it undergoes renal elimination; its clearance is greater than the glomerular filtration rate suggesting that there is some renal tubular secretion of the compound.

Economics

Brand names
Zolmitriptan is marketed by AstraZeneca with the brand names Zomig, Zomigon (Argentina, Canada & Greece), AscoTop (Germany) and Zomigoro (France).

Economics
In 2008, Zomig generated nearly $154 million in sales.

AstraZeneca's U.S. patent on Zomig tablets expired on November 14, 2012, and its pediatric exclusivity extension expired on May 14, 2013. The patent in certain European countries has already expired too, and generic drug maker Actavis released a generic version in those countries, starting in March 2012.

Legal status 
In Russia versions of zolmitriptan, which are not registered in the National registry of medications, may be regarded as narcotic drugs (derivatives of dimethyltriptamine).

References

Further reading

External links 
 
 

Triptans
2-Oxazolidinones
AstraZeneca brands
5-HT1D agonists